SV Wehen Wiesbaden is a German association football club based in Wiesbaden, Hesse. Since the beginning of the 2007–08 season the club no longer plays its home games in Taunusstein, where they were originally located. In the summer of 2007 Wiesbaden was added to the original name of SV Wehen. The club currently competes in the 3. Liga.

History

Amateur Football (1926–1994)

The club was founded under the name of SV Wehen 1926 – Taunusstein in 1926 and disbanded by the Nazi government in 1933, although the football department was maintained by playing occasional friendly matches until 1939. The club re-established itself in 1946, following World War II. They operated both first and reserve teams from the beginning, with their first team competing in local amateur division, the B-Klasse Wiesbaden. The club's first youth team was established in 1955 and they subsequently started to use their own talented young players to strengthen the first team. By the mid-1970s, the youth department was split in ten teams with more than 150 players and a women's team was first established in 1984. Wehen won the Hessenpokal in 1988, 1996 and 2000, which gave them berths in the German Cup in those years.

Third Tier and upwards (1994–)

In 1994, the third tier of German football underwent a reform which resulted in the elevation of the Regionalliga. Wehen had finished seventh in the Oberliga Hessen in the previous year and thus became a founding member of the Regionalliga Süd. In spite of its relegation in 1995, the club managed to establish itself in the newly-founded league over the next ten years.

At the end of the 2006–07 season, Wehen finished first and earned promotion to the 2.Bundesliga. Its first second-tier season saw the club finish eighth and the inauguration of its current home, Brita-Arena. In spite of a berth in the DFB Pokal quarterfinals, Wehen was relegated to the 3. Liga in 2009, which would remain the club's division for the next ten seasons.

Wehen achieved a third-place finish at the end of the 2018–19 season and thereby qualified for the promotion playoffs to the 2.Bundesliga against FC Ingolstadt. After a 1–2 defeat in their home game, the team managed to carry a 3–2 victory on Ingolstadt's turf. Advancing on away goals, Wehen was promoted to the 2. Bundesliga for only the second time in club history. However, the club experienced a difficult 2019–20 season and finished in 17th place, fielding the league's worst defence with 65 goals conceded. Along with Dynamo Dresden, Wehen were relegated after just one season in the second tier.

Honours

League
 Regionalliga Süd (III)
 Champions: 2007
 Oberliga Hessen (IV)
 Champions: 1997
 Landesliga Hessen-Mitte (IV)
 Champions: 1989

Cup
 Hesse Cup (Tiers III-VII)
 Winners: 1988, 1996, 2000, 2011, 2017, 2019, 2021
 Runners-up: 1992, 2001, 2003, 2013, 2016

Players

Current squad

Out on loan

Recent managers
Recent managers of the club:

Recent seasons
The recent season-by-season performance of the club:

With the introduction of the Regionalligas in 1994 and the 3. Liga in 2008 as the new third tier, below the 2. Bundesliga, all leagues below dropped one tier.

Key

References

External links

 
The Abseits Guide to German Soccer
SV Wehen Wiesbaden at Weltfussball.de 
Das deutsche Fußball-Archiv  historical German domestic league tables

 
Football clubs in Germany
Football clubs in Hesse
Association football clubs established in 1926
1926 establishments in Germany
Sport in Wiesbaden
2. Bundesliga clubs
3. Liga clubs